Apsley is a small town in Victoria, Australia. It is on the Wimmera Highway, in the Shire of West Wimmera, 420 kilometres north-west of Melbourne, and 7 kilometres east of the South Australian border. The town is named after Apsley House in London. It was surveyed in 1851 and proclaimed in 1852, a Post Office opening on 1 January 1854 replacing that of Lake Wallace (open since 1 March 1849) nearer what is now Edenhope serving the grazing population.

The population at the 2016 census was 277. The town is close to Lake Bringalbert and Newlands Lake, and the Saint Gregory's Vineyard, which specialises in port wine.

Apsley had a football club that competed in the Kowree Naracoorte Football League from 1937. Later this would become the Kowree Naracoorte Tatiara Football League where Apsley competed until 1998, when they merged with Edenhope. Since 2007 Edenhope Apsley have played in the Horsham & District Football League. Apsley's best known sportspersons were footballers Reg Burgess, who played for the Essendon Football Club, Murrie Batt, who played for the Collingwood Football Club, 2020 Brownlow Medalist Lachie Neale, who currently plays for the Brisbane Lions Football Club and Hattie Shand who plays Hockey for Australia. 

A large Red-flowering Gum on Wallace Street is listed on the National Trust of Australia's Significant Tree Register for Victoria.

Golfers play at the Apsley Golf Club on the Wimmera Highway.

In 2014, 12 farm families banded together to buy the pub. The Border Inn Hotel has completed an extensive renovation, and has a small attached general store for the town, which has recently opened.

The township also has a state primary school.

References

Department of Sustainability and Environment: Know your town - Apsley

Towns in Victoria (Australia)
Wimmera